High Country Snows is the ninth album by American singer-songwriter Dan Fogelberg, released in 1985 (see 1985 in music).  This album was a seminal part of Progressive Bluegrass, or "Newgrass", and featured many bluegrass star players.

Track listing
All songs written by Dan Fogelberg, except where noted.

"Down the Road" (Lester Flatt, Earl Scruggs) – 0:27
"Mountain Pass" – 2:45
"Sutter's Mill" – 6:32
"Wolf Creek" – 2:52
"High Country Snows" – 4:42
"The Outlaw" (Jay Bolotin) – 3:23
"Shallow Rivers" – 3:10
"Go Down Easy" (Bolotin) – 3:52
"Wandering Shepherd" – 3:19
"Think of What You've Done" (Carter Stanley) – 2:35
"The Higher You Climb" – 6:07

Personnel 
 Dan Fogelberg – lead vocals, acoustic guitar (2–11), harmony vocals (3, 6, 7, 8, 11), acoustic piano (5), electric guitar (6, 8, 11), handclaps (8), Kurzweil synthesizer (11)
 Michael Hanna – Yamaha DX7 (8)
 David Briggs – acoustic piano (11)
 Jerry Douglas – dobro (2, 6, 7)
 David Grisman – mandola (2, 4), mandolin (4, 6, 7, 10)
 Doc Watson – acoustic guitar (4)
 Chris Hillman – mandolin (5), backing vocals (5)
 Al Perkins – pedal steel guitar (5, 11)
 Barry "Byrd" Burton – dobro (8)
 Emory Gordy Jr. – bass (2–8, 10, 11)
 Russ Kunkel – drums (2–8, 10, 11), tambourine (8), handclaps (8)
 Dan Murakami – handclaps (8)
 Charlie McCoy – harmonica (3, 7)
 Jim Buchanan – fiddle (2, 6, 7, 10)
 Herb Pedersen – harmony vocals (1, 7, 9), banjo (2, 3, 4, 6, 7, 10)
 Ricky Skaggs – harmony vocals (1, 2, 10)
 Vince Gill – harmony vocals (9)
 Anita Ball – backing vocals (11)
 Dianne Davidson – backing vocals (11)
 Tracy Nelson – backing vocals (11)

Production 
 Producers – Dan Fogelberg and Marty Lewis
 Engineers – J.T. Cantwell, Terry Christian and Marty Lewis.
 Recorded at The Bennett House (Franklin, TN).
 Mixed at Sunset Sound (Los Angeles, CA).
 Mastered by George Marino at Sterling Sound (New York, NY).
 Art Direction and Design – Ron Larson and John Kosh
 Photography – Joel Bernstein

Charts
Album – Billboard (United States)

Singles – Billboard (United States)

References

Dan Fogelberg albums
1985 albums